Vinzenz Geiger (born 24 July 1997) is a German Nordic combined skier and the 2022 Olympic champion.

He debuted in the World Cup in the 2015–16 season in Lillehammer, Norway in December 2016 finishing 31st in the Large Hill. His first win in the World Cup came in Val di Fiemme, in the 2018–19 season, in January 2019.

Record

Olympic Games

World Championship

World Cup

Standings

Individual victories

References

External links

German male Nordic combined skiers
Living people
1997 births
Olympic Nordic combined skiers of Germany
Nordic combined skiers at the 2018 Winter Olympics
Nordic combined skiers at the 2022 Winter Olympics
People from Oberstdorf
Sportspeople from Swabia (Bavaria)
Olympic gold medalists for Germany
Olympic silver medalists for Germany
Olympic medalists in Nordic combined
Medalists at the 2018 Winter Olympics
Medalists at the 2022 Winter Olympics
21st-century German people